Sérgio Paulo Mendes de Sousa Pinto (born July 29, 1972 in Lisbon) is a Portuguese politician and Member of the European Parliament for the Socialist Party; part of the Party of European Socialists.

Political career

Member of the European Parliament, 1999–2009
Sousa Pinto first entered the European Parliament following the 1999 European elections. Between 1999 and 2004, he served on the Committee on Citizens' Freedoms and Rights, Justice and Home Affairs before moving to the Committee on Constitutional Affairs in 2004. In addition, he was the chairman of the parliament's delegation for relations with Mercosur.

Member of the Portuguese Parliament, 2011–present
Sousa Pinto has been a member of the Assembly of the Republic since the 2011 national elections. In 2013, he succeeded Alberto Martins as chairman of the Committee on Foreign Affairs and Portuguese Communities.

Sousa Pinto resigned from the PS leadership for disagreeing with the party's leader, António Costa, on forming a parliamentary alliance with three euroskeptic left wing  parties after the 2015 national elections.

Links
Webpage of the MEP

References

1972 births
Living people
Socialist Party (Portugal) MEPs
MEPs for Portugal 2004–2009
MEPs for Portugal 1999–2004
Members of the Assembly of the Republic (Portugal)